Hu Shihua (1912 – April 11, 1998) was a Chinese mathematician. He was a member of the Chinese Academy of Sciences.

References 

1912 births
1998 deaths
Members of the Chinese Academy of Sciences
National University of Peking alumni